The International Register of Shipping or IS was established in 1993, and is an independent classification society which provides classification, certification, verification and advisory services. The International Register of Shipping also offers consulting services well suited for the shipping and offshore industry.

Available Services 
Classification

 Appraisal of the design during and after construction
 Surveys at the time of construction, entry into class and modifications to ensure that the vessel meets the criteria stipulated by the rules
 Issuance of a 'Certificate of Classification' and entering of the vessel's particulars into the society's Register of Ships
 Periodical surveys as stipulated by the rules to ensure continued maintenance of conditions of classifications
 Additional surveys as deemed necessary in view of damages or reported poor condition of the vessel by port state control authorities

Verification
 Appraisal of plans and documents
 Stage Inspections during manufacture
 Inspection and testing of components or finished products
 Laboratory testing at approved facilities
 Auditing of the management systems

Statutory Certification
 International Convention on Load line (Load Line)
 International Convention for the Safety of Life at Sea (SOLAS)
 Convention on the International Regulations for Preventing Collisions at Sea (COLREG)
 International Convention for the Prevention of Pollution from Ships (MARPOL)
 International Convention on Tonnage Measurement of Ships (ITC 1969)
 Code of Safe Practice for Solid Bulk Cargoes (BC Code)
 International Management Code for the Safe Operation of Ships and for Pollution Prevention(ISM Code)
 International Ship and Port facility Security Code (ISPS Code)
 International Grain Code (Grain Code)
 Caribbean Cargo Ship Safety Code (Caribbean Code)
 Crew Accommodations, ILO Convention 92,153
 Cargo Gear, ILO Convention 152
 Minimum Standards in Merchant Ships, ILO Convention 147
 Bulk Chemical Code (BCH Code)
 International Bulk Chemical Code (IBC Code)
 Gas Carrier Code (GC Code)
 International Gas Carrier Code (IGC Code)
 High Speed Craft Code (HSC Code)
 Code of Safety for Dynamically Supported Craft

Maritime Consulting
 Preparation of Mandatory Vessel documentations
 Booklet, Cargo Securing Manual, SOPEP, PCSOPEP, SMPEP, P&A Manual, COW manual, ODMCS Manual
 New building Services on behalf of owners
 Concept Design Preparation of Technical Specifications
 Bid Analysis
 Detailed design
 Specification survey during new construction on behalf of owners
 Verification of conformance for purchase of marine equipment
 Design of modifications and renovations and/or refitting
 Failure Mode Effect Analysis, HAZOP, FSA
 Pre-purchase or on hire/off-hire condition surveys
 Port Engineering - including supervision during dry dockings or other repairs
 Computer based preventive maintenance systems

Training
 Administered through International Register Training Institute (IRTI)
 Complies with ISO 9001:2000 requirements

International Register of Shipping's head office is located in Miami, Florida.

External links
International Register of Shipping. Official site.
Linkedin

Companies based in Miami
Ship classification societies
Business services companies established in 1993
Shipping